Artrell Hawkins, Jr. (born November 24, 1976) is a former American football player of the National Football League. He was drafted by the Cincinnati Bengals in the second round of the 1998 NFL Draft. He played college football at Cincinnati.

Hawkins played cornerback for the Bengals, Carolina Panthers and later transitioned to safety for the New England Patriots. He finished his 10-year career as a member of the New York Jets prior to the 2008 season.

Early years
Artrell Hawkins, Jr. was born the son of Artrell Hawkins Sr. and Aletha (Haselrig-Jones) Hawkins on November 24, 1976. He attended Bishop McCort High School in Johnstown, Pennsylvania, where he was named conference offensive player of the year as a senior after rushing for a school record 26 touchdowns and 1,487 yards, including a single-game record 265 yards. He also lettered in basketball and baseball at Bishop McCort.

Hawkins' father, Artrell Hawkins, Sr. was a three-year letterman at the University of Pittsburgh and was signed by the Pittsburgh Steelers as a rookie free agent in 1980.

Hawkins attended the University of Cincinnati, where he majored in business and lettered in football for four years (1994–1997) as a defensive back and kick returner under head coach Rick Minter. His senior year, the Bearcats went 8–4 and played in the Humanitarian Bowl, breaking the school's 47-year drought of not appearing in a bowl game. The Bearcats defeated Utah State University, 35–19.

Professional career
Hawkins was drafted by the Cincinnati Bengals in the second round of the 1998 NFL Draft, where he played cornerback for six years. In his rookie year of 1998, he started in all 16 Bengals' games, recording 65 tackles, five assists, one sack and three interceptions.

In 1999, Hawkins played in 14 games (starting 13) and totaled 61 tackles and seven assists. In 2000, he played in all 16 games, starting six, and recorded 43 tackles and four assists.

In 2001, Hawkins rebounded and played in 14 games (starting 13), totaling 49 tackles, 10 assists, and three interceptions. In 2002, he started and played in 15 games, recording 69 tackles, seven assists, two sacks, and two interceptions, including a league-leading and team record 102-yard interception return for a touchdown on a pass by David Carr in a 38–3 Bengals' win over the Houston Texans. In 2003, his sixth and final season with the Bengals, he played in 14 games, starting nine, with 50 tackles, five assists, and one interception.

After that season he signed for 2004 with the Carolina Panthers, for whom he played 14 games (starting four) with 24 tackles, five assists and one interception.

For the 2005 season, Hawkins joined the New England Patriots, playing in five games (starting four) with 11 tackles, six assists and one sack. In 2006, he played in 14 games for the Patriots, starting 12 games and recording 54 tackles, 19 assists, and one interception. He was released by the Patriots during the summer of 2007.

After sitting out the 2007 season, Hawkins signed with the New York Jets in February, 2008. He announced his retirement on August 1, 2008, prior to the regular season.

His younger brother, Andrew Hawkins, retired from playing in the league in July 2017, after stints with the Bengals and Browns.

Since retiring, Hawkins has been a fixture on Cincinnati sportstalk radio, beginning as a University of Cincinnati sideline reporter and also various co-hosting and guest duties. Hawkins also is a weekly contributor to the Bengals Radio Network.

NFL statistics

References

2.  https://web.archive.org/web/20120426012434/http://www.artrellhawkins.com/about/

External links
New England Patriots bio

1976 births
Living people
Sportspeople from Johnstown, Pennsylvania
American football cornerbacks
American football safeties
Players of American football from Pennsylvania
Cincinnati Bearcats football players
Cincinnati Bengals players
Carolina Panthers players
Washington Redskins players
New England Patriots players
New York Jets players